Lophocampa distincta, is a moth of the family Erebidae. It was described by Walter Rothschild in 1910. It is found in Peru, Brazil, Argentina, Colombia and Ecuador.

Wingspan for the male 26 mm and for the female 29 mm.

The larvae feed on Gunnera species.

Subspecies
L. d. distincta (Peru, Ecuador)
L. d. binominata (Strand, 1919) (Argentina)
L. d. brasilibia (Strand, 1919) (Brazil, Peru)
L. d. brunnescens (Rothschild, 1909) (Peru)
L. d. obsolescens (Rothschild, 1910) (Colombia, Ecuador)

References

External links
Lophocampa distincta at BOLD Systems

distincta
Moths of Central America
Moths of South America
Taxa named by Walter Rothschild
Moths described in 1909